Dream City is an operetta in two acts with music by Victor Herbert and a libretto by Edgar Smith. The original production opened at Weber's Music Hall in New York City on December 24, 1906, and ran for 102 performances until March 23, 1907.  The show contained a one-act musical burlesque The Magic Knight which parodies Richard Wagner's opera Lohengrin.

References

Operas
English-language operettas
1906 operas
Operas by Victor Herbert